A geometer is a mathematician whose area of study is geometry.

Some notable geometers and their main fields of work, chronologically listed, are:

1000 BCE to 1 BCE 

 Baudhayana (fl. c. 800 BC) – Euclidean geometry, geometric algebra
 Manava (c. 750 BC–690 BC) – Euclidean geometry
 Thales of Miletus (c. 624 BC – c. 546 BC) – Euclidean geometry
 Pythagoras (c. 570 BC – c. 495 BC) – Euclidean geometry, Pythagorean theorem
 Zeno of Elea (c. 490 BC – c. 430 BC) – Euclidean geometry
 Hippocrates of Chios (born c. 470 – 410 BC) – first systematically organized Stoicheia – Elements (geometry textbook)
 Mozi (c. 468 BC – c. 391 BC)
 Plato (427–347 BC)
 Theaetetus (c. 417 BC – 369 BC) 
 Autolycus of Pitane (360–c. 290 BC) – astronomy, spherical geometry
 Euclid (fl. 300 BC) – Elements, Euclidean geometry (sometimes called the "father of geometry")
 Apollonius of Perga (c. 262 BC – c. 190 BC) – Euclidean geometry, conic sections 
 Archimedes (c. 287 BC – c. 212 BC) – Euclidean geometry
 Eratosthenes (c. 276 BC – c. 195/194 BC) – Euclidean geometry
 Katyayana (c. 3rd century BC) – Euclidean geometry

1–1300 AD 
 Hero of Alexandria (c. AD 10–70) – Euclidean geometry
 Pappus of Alexandria (c. AD 290–c. 350) – Euclidean geometry, projective geometry
 Hypatia of Alexandria (c. AD 370–c. 415) – Euclidean geometry
 Brahmagupta (597–668) – Euclidean geometry, cyclic quadrilaterals
 Vergilius of Salzburg (c.700–784) – Irish bishop of Aghaboe, Ossory and later Salzburg, Austria; antipodes, and astronomy
 Al-Abbās ibn Said al-Jawharī (c. 800–c. 860)
 Thabit ibn Qurra (826–901) – analytic geometry, non-Euclidean geometry, conic sections
 Abu'l-Wáfa (940–998) – spherical geometry, non-Euclidean geometry
 Alhazen (965–c. 1040)
 Omar Khayyam (1048–1131) – algebraic geometry, conic sections
 Ibn Maḍāʾ (1116–1196)

1301–1800 AD 

 Piero della Francesca (1415–1492)
 Leonardo da Vinci (1452–1519) – Euclidean geometry
 Jyesthadeva (c. 1500 – c. 1610) – Euclidean geometry, cyclic quadrilaterals
 Marin Getaldić (1568–1626)
 Jacques-François Le Poivre (1652–1710), projective geometry
 Johannes Kepler (1571–1630) – (used geometric ideas in astronomical work)
 Edmund Gunter (1581–1686)
 Girard Desargues (1591–1661) – projective geometry; Desargues' theorem
 René Descartes (1596–1650) – invented the methodology of analytic geometry, also called Cartesian geometry after him
 Pierre de Fermat (1607–1665) – analytic geometry
 Blaise Pascal (1623–1662) – projective geometry
 Giordano Vitale (1633–1711)
 Philippe de La Hire (1640–1718) – projective geometry
 Isaac Newton (1642–1727) – 3rd-degree algebraic curve
 Giovanni Ceva (1647–1734) – Euclidean geometry
 Johann Jacob Heber (1666–1727) – surveyor and geometer
 Giovanni Gerolamo Saccheri (1667–1733) – non-Euclidean geometry
 Leonhard Euler (1707–1783)
 Tobias Mayer (1723–1762)
 Johann Heinrich Lambert (1728–1777) – non-Euclidean geometry
 Gaspard Monge (1746–1818) – descriptive geometry
 John Playfair (1748–1819) – Euclidean geometry
 Lazare Nicolas Marguerite Carnot (1753–1823) – projective geometry
 Joseph Diaz Gergonne (1771–1859) – projective geometry; Gergonne point
 Carl Friedrich Gauss (1777–1855) – Theorema Egregium
 Louis Poinsot (1777–1859)
 Siméon Denis Poisson (1781–1840)
 Jean-Victor Poncelet (1788–1867) – projective geometry
 Augustin-Louis Cauchy (1789 – 1857)
 August Ferdinand Möbius (1790–1868) – Euclidean geometry
 Nikolai Ivanovich Lobachevsky (1792–1856) – hyperbolic geometry, a non-Euclidean geometry
 Germinal Dandelin (1794–1847) – Dandelin spheres in conic sections
 Jakob Steiner (1796–1863) – champion of synthetic geometry methodology, projective geometry, Euclidean geometry

1801–1900 AD 

 Karl Wilhelm Feuerbach (1800–1834) – Euclidean geometry
 Julius Plücker (1801–1868)
 János Bolyai (1802–1860) – hyperbolic geometry, a non-Euclidean geometry
 Christian Heinrich von Nagel (1803–1882) – Euclidean geometry
 Johann Benedict Listing (1808–1882) – topology
 Hermann Günther Grassmann (1809–1877) – exterior algebra
 Ludwig Otto Hesse (1811–1874) – algebraic invariants and geometry
 Ludwig Schlafli (1814–1895) – Regular 4-polytope
 Pierre Ossian Bonnet (1819–1892) – differential geometry
 Arthur Cayley (1821–1895)
 Joseph Bertrand (1822–1900) 
 Delfino Codazzi (1824–1873) – differential geometry
 Bernhard Riemann (1826–1866) – elliptic geometry (a non-Euclidean geometry) and  Riemannian geometry
 Julius Wilhelm Richard Dedekind (1831–1916)
 Ludwig Burmester (1840–1927) – theory of linkages
 Edmund Hess (1843–1903)
 Albert Victor Bäcklund (1845–1922)
 Max Noether (1844–1921) – algebraic geometry
 Henri Brocard (1845–1922) – Brocard points
 William Kingdon Clifford (1845–1879) – geometric algebra
 Pieter Hendrik Schoute (1846–1923)
 Felix Klein (1849–1925)
 Sofia Vasilyevna Kovalevskaya (1850–1891)
 Evgraf Fedorov (1853–1919)
 Henri Poincaré (1854–1912)
 Luigi Bianchi (1856–1928) – differential geometry
 Alicia Boole Stott (1860–1940) 
 Hermann Minkowski (1864–1909) – non-Euclidean geometry
 Henry Frederick Baker (1866–1956) – algebraic geometry
 Élie Cartan (1869–1951)
 Dmitri Egorov (1869–1931) – differential geometry
 Veniamin Kagan (1869–1953)
 Raoul Bricard (1870–1944) – descriptive geometry
 Ernst Steinitz (1871–1928) – Steinitz's theorem
 Marcel Grossmann (1878–1936)
 Oswald Veblen (1880–1960) – projective geometry, differential geometry
 Emmy Noether (1882–1935) – algebraic topology 
 Harry Clinton Gossard (1884–1954) 
 Arthur Rosenthal (1887–1959)
 Helmut Hasse (1898–1979) – algebraic geometry

1901–present 

 Denis Auroux (1977–)
 William Vallance Douglas Hodge (1903–1975)
 Patrick du Val (1903–1987)
 Beniamino Segre (1903–1977) – combinatorial geometry
 J. C. P. Miller (1906–1981)
 André Weil (1906–1998) – Algebraic geometry
 H. S. M. Coxeter (1907–2003) – theory of polytopes, non-Euclidean geometry, projective geometry
 J. A. Todd (1908–1994)
 Daniel Pedoe (1910–1998) 
 Shiing-Shen Chern (1911–2004) – differential geometry
 Ernst Witt (1911–1991)
 Rafael Artzy (1912–2006)
 Aleksandr Danilovich Aleksandrov (1912–1999)
 László Fejes Tóth (1915–2005)
 Edwin Evariste Moise (1918–1998)
 Aleksei Pogorelov (1919–2002) – differential geometry
 Magnus Wenninger (1919–2017) – polyhedron models
 Jean-Louis Koszul (1921–2018)
 Isaak Yaglom (1921–1988)
 Benoit Mandelbrot (1924–2010) – fractal geometry
 Katsumi Nomizu (1924–2008) – affine differential geometry
 Michael S. Longuet-Higgins (1925–2016)
 John Leech (1926–1992)
 Alexander Grothendieck (1928–2014) – algebraic geometry
 Branko Grünbaum (1929–2018) – discrete geometry
 Michael Atiyah (1929–2019)
 Lev Semenovich Pontryagin (1908–1988)
 Geoffrey Colin Shephard (1927–2016)
 Norman W. Johnson (1930–2017)
 John Milnor (1931–)
 Roger Penrose (1931–)
 Yuri Manin (1937–) – algebraic geometry and diophantine geometry
 Vladimir Arnold (1937–2010) – algebraic geometry
 Ernest Vinberg (1937–2020)
 J. H. Conway (1937–2020) – sphere packing, recreational geometry
 Robin Hartshorne (1938–) – geometry, algebraic geometry
 Phillip Griffiths (1938–) – algebraic geometry, differential geometry
 Enrico Bombieri (1940–) – algebraic geometry
 Robert Williams (1942–)
 Peter McMullen (1942–)
 Richard S. Hamilton (1943–) – differential geometry, Ricci flow, Poincaré conjecture
 Mikhail Gromov (1943–)
 Rudy Rucker (1946–)
 William Thurston (1946–2012)
 Shing-Tung Yau (1949–)
Michael Freedman (1951–)
 Egon Schulte (1955–) – polytopes
 George W. Hart (1955–) – sculptor
 Károly Bezdek (1955–) – discrete geometry, sphere packing, Euclidean geometry, non-Euclidean geometry
 Simon Donaldson (1957–)
 Kenji Fukaya (1959–)  – symplectic geometry
 Oh Yong-Geun (1961–)
 Toshiyuki Kobayashi (1962–)
 Hiraku Nakajima (1962–) – representation theory and geometry
 Hwang Jun-Muk (1963–) – algebraic geometry, differential geometry
 Grigori Perelman (1966–) – Poincaré conjecture
 Maryam Mirzakhani (1977–2017)

Geometers in art

References 

Geometers